Aletha Jauch Solter (born 1945) is a Swiss/American developmental psychologist who studied with Jean Piaget in Switzerland before earning a PhD in psychology at the University of California, Santa Barbara. Her specialist areas are attachment, psychological trauma, and non-punitive discipline.

What differentiates her work is that it combines attachment parenting principles with an understanding of the impact of stress and trauma, and thus her work is apparently able to help families who are struggling with sleep, discipline, and emotional health issues that other approaches have been unable to resolve.

Her first book, The Aware Baby, has sold over 200,000 copies worldwide. Subsequent publications are Cooperative and Connected, Tears and Tantrums, Raising Drug-Free Kids, Attachment Play, and Healing Your Traumatized Child.

In 1990 she founded The Aware Parenting Institute, an international organization with certified instructors in many countries. She has led workshops for parents and professionals in 17 countries.

Published books 
Aletha Solter has written six books describing the Aware Parenting approach, which have been translated into many languages.
 
 The Aware Baby. Shining Star Press, 2001.
 Cooperative and Connected: Helping children flourish without punishments or rewards, Shining Star Press, 2018. (This is a revised and updated version of Helping Young Children Flourish.) 
 Tears and Tantrums: What to do when babies and children cry. Shining Star Press, 1998.
 Raising Drug-Free Kids: 100 tips for parents. Da Capo Press, 2006.
 Attachment Play: How to solve children's behavior problems with play, laughter, and connection. Shining Star Press, 2013.
 Healing Your Traumatized Child: A Parent's Guide to Children's Natural Recovery Processes. Shining Star Press, 2022.

Published articles 
 A 2-year-old child's memory of hospitalization during early infancy. Infant and Child Development, 2008, 17, 593–605.
 A case study of traumatic stress disorder in a 5-month-old infant following surgery. Infant Mental Health Journal, 2007, 28(1), 76–96.
 Hold me! The importance of physical contact with infants. Journal of Prenatal and Perinatal Psychology and Health, 2001, 15(3), 21–43.
 Warum Babys weinen (Why babies cry). In T. Harms (Ed.), Auf die Welt gekommen: Die neuen Baby Therapien (pp. 387–409). Ulrich Leutner Verlag, Berlin, 2000.
 Helping Preschoolers Cope With Stress. In B. Farber (Ed.), Guiding Young Children's Behavior: Helpful Ideas for Parents and Teachers from 28 Early Childhood Experts (pp. 118–123). Preschool Publications, Inc., 1999.
 Why do babies cry? Journal of Prenatal and Perinatal Psychology and Health, 1995, 10(1), 21–43.
 Understanding tears and tantrums. Young Children, 1992, 47(4), 64–68. (National Association for the Education of Young Children)
 Speed, accuracy, and strategy differences in spatial processing. Bulletin of the Psychonomics Society, 1981, 18(2), 58-59 (with J.W. Pellegrino & V. Cantoni). 
 Broader transfer produced by guided discovery of number concepts with preschool children. Journal of Educational Psychology, 1978, 70(3), 363-371 (with R.E. Mayer).

Reference and sources 
 Aware Parenting Institute
 Amazon's Aletha Solter Page
 Aware Parenting YouTube channel
 Baltrotsky, K., Bradbury, J., Rose, M., Grace, S., & Doran, F. (2022). Evaluation of a Brief Attachment-Based Parenting Program: Aware Parenting. Child & Family Behavior Therapy,  DOI: 10.1080/07317107.2022.2141600.

External links

American developmental psychologists
American women psychologists
American family and parenting writers
American people of Swiss descent
1945 births
Living people
21st-century American women
Swiss psychologists
Swiss women psychologists